The women's 500 m time trial at the 2011 Dutch National Track Championships in Apeldoorn took place at Omnisport Apeldoorn on December 27, 2011. 12 athletes participated in the contest. Willy Kanis won the gold medal, Yvonne Hijgenaar took silver and Laura van der Kamp won the bronze.

Results

Results from uci.ch.

References

2011 Dutch National track cycling championships
Track cycling
Dutch